Yengeh Hoseyn (also Romanized as Yengeh Ḩoseyn, Yeng Ḩoseyn; also known as Leyg Ḩoseyn and Qal‘eh-ye Yengeh Ḩoseyn) is a village in Zhan Rural District, in the Central District of Dorud County, Lorestan Province, Iran. At the 2006 census, its population was 51, in 11 families.

References 

Towns and villages in Dorud County